Mahesh Basnet is a Nepalese Communist politician. He is a member of the House of Representatives elected from Bhaktapur district in the election of the Federal Parliament held in 2017. He is alleged to have kidnapped Janata Samajbadi party  Surendra Yadav. He served as Minister of Industry under Prime Minister Sushil Koirala.  He served as Chief of Youth Force Nepal on 2008 and is serving as Chairman of Youth Association Nepal since 2009. He contested in the 2013 Nepalese Constituent Assembly election from Bhaktapur district constituency number 2. While serving as Minister of Industry, Basnet waived off the loans provided to industrialists affected by earthquake.

Family 
He was born on 16 January,D at G-4, Bhaktapur district to father Purna Bahadur Basnet and mother Ishwari Basnet. His autobiographical book Ma Mahe,sh was published in 2016 which w,as co-authored by Shikhar Ghimirey.

References

Living people
1975 births
Communist Party of Nepal (Unified Marxist–Leninist) politicians
Government ministers of Nepal
People from Bhaktapur District
Nepal MPs 2017–2022
Nepal Communist Party (NCP) politicians